Çiğli (Silleon in Greek) is a metropolitan district of İzmir in western Turkey. It covers the northern end of İzmir Metropolitan Municipality around the mouth of the River Gediz, across the Gulf of İzmir from the main city. The Gediz delta is an Important Bird Area but is under threat from urbanization. IAOIZ, the Izmir Atatürk Organized Industrial Zone, is a significant economic hub and there is a major air force base.

History 
Çiğ means dew in Turkish, a reference to the delta marshes of the River Gediz which used to cover the entire area. It is a relatively recent settlement created largely by migration from other parts of Turkey, starting with Turkish refugees of the Russo-Turkish War (1877-1878). Turks from the surrounding region took refuge in the marshes during the Greco-Turkish War (1919-1922), and were joined by ethnic Turks from the Greek province of Western Thrace after the war. The population was further increased by survivors of two earthquakes in eastern Anatolia in 1946 and 1966.  Economic migration from eastern Anatolia has continued at a steady pace since then and even the mayor was born in Diyarbakır.

Geography 

Çiğli was built on the delta marshes where the River Gediz flows into the Gulf of İzmir. It lies between Karşıyaka, another metropolitan district, to the south and the west, and İzmir's external dependent district of Menemen to the north. The western boundary is formed by the current delta of the River Gediz where the land is under the constant pressure of further urbanization. The future of the delta is among priority issues in Turkey's agenda of the protection of the environment. Many citizens would like to see full protection for the delta assured to preserve its unique fauna and flora along bird migration routes. The delta is an IBA (Important Bird Area) registered with BirdLife International.

Government 
Çiğli gained village status after the fall of the Ottoman Empire and became a municipality in 1956. It was attached to İzmir's metropolitan area in 1981, first as a dependency of the district of Karşıyaka, and in 1992 it became a distinct entity with its own administrative structures. The district is divided into 23 subdistricts, and also has one separate dependent municipality (Sasalı) and a dependent village (Kaklıç).

Demography 
The district had a population of 168,599 in 2012. The populations of Sasalı and Kaklıç are roughly the same at around 3000 people.

Economy 
IAOIZ, the Izmir Atatürk Organized Industrial Zone has 485 factories employing 30,000 people.

Culture and community 

Ekol Sanat Galerisi is a small privately owned art gallery with regular exhibitions.

Landmarks 
The İzmir Bird Paradise (Kuş Cenneti) has recorded 205 species of birds, including 63 species that are resident year-round, 54 species of summer migratory birds, 43 species of winter migratory birds, and 30 transient species. 56 species of birds have bred in the park. The sanctuary, which covers 80 square kilometres, was registered as "the protected area for water birds and for their breeding" by the Turkish Ministry of Forestry in 1982. The Sasalı Park of Natural Life (Doğal Yaşam Parkı) is a large open-air zoo established in 2008.

Transport 

Çiğli Air Base is now used only by the military but served as İzmir's airport until the new Adnan Menderes Airport opened. Çiğli railway station is served by Turkish State Railways and by the new commuter rail line İZBAN.

Education 
İzmir Kâtip Çelebi University was established in 2010. There was a medical campus of Gediz University, which closed during the 2016 Turkish purges.

Religious sites 
There are 20 mosques including the Küçük Çiğli Cami, Egekent Cami, Esentepe Cami and İzzet Erişen Cami.

Sport 
Karşıyaka S.K. run teams in several sports at the nearby Karşıyaka Arena.

References

External links 
 Metropolitan Municipality of Greater İzmir
 Çiğli  by İzmir Chamber of Commerce 
 

 
Populated places in İzmir Province